Jüri Morozov (born 10 September 1958 in Otepää) is an Estonian politician. He was a member of XII Riigikogu.

He has been a member of Estonian Social Democratic Party.

References

Living people
1958 births
Social Democratic Party (Estonia) politicians
Members of the Riigikogu, 2011–2015
Estonian University of Life Sciences alumni
Tallinn University alumni
People from Otepää